Ananda Chandra Agarwala (1874–1940) was a writer, poet, historian, translator and administrative officer from Sonitpur district of Assam. He is known as Bhangoni Kunwor (ভাঙনি কোঁৱৰ) for his translation of several English poems into Assamese. He was elected as a president of the Asam Sahitya Sabha in 1934 held at Mangaldoi. He was honoured with the title of Raibahadur by the ruling British Government. Ananda Chandra Agarwala was the brother of noted Assamese poet Chandra Kumar Agarwala and uncle of Jyoti Prasad Agarwala, a poet, playwright, composer, lyricist, writer and first Assamese Filmmaker.

Literary works and life 
Growing up in a cultural and intellectual environment, the mother’s influence on the life of Anand Chandra Agarwal was immense. Ananda Chandra Agarwala’s devout mother is his original guru.

Ananda Chandra Agarwal’s first published collection of poems was called 'Jilikani'. Anand Chandra Agarwal, who continued to beautify the original in the translation of foreign poetry, is known as Bhangani Konwar in Assamese poetry literature. There is no comparison of the poems broken by Ananda Chandra Agarwala, who occupied a distinct place in Assamese poetry and literary world as a Bhangani Konwar. He broke the poems by applying pure Assamese language without damaging the beauty of the original poem. His first collection of poems, Jilikani, also included several broken poems.

Agarawala’s Contribution to society

After taking over as president at the Mangaldai session of Assam Sahitya Sabha in addition to the president’s address given to Ananda Chandra Agarwal as president in 1934, the spiritual articles are written by him, the rules of Assamese letter alliance, etc., are currently considered as the national treasures of Assamese. Importantly, Ananda Chandra Agarwala, who performed his duty in different parts of Assam including Silchar, Guwahati, Dibrugarh, etc., while working in police department, wrote a book in English in 1906 on the law and regulations of the police called 'Police Manual'.

Two textbooks written by Ananda Chandra Agarwala are soft texts published in 1910 and original texts published in 1920. Importantly, these two are two important books used today to learn Assamese languages.

Literary works
Poetry book:
 Jilikoni,

Historical books
 An Account of Assam
 Goalparar Purani Bibaran
 Aspects of history and culture

Text books:
 Kumal Path
 Adi Path.

Others:
 Police Manual (1906)

See also
 Assamese literature
 History of Assamese literature
 List of Asam Sahitya Sabha presidents
 List of Assamese-language poets
 List of Assamese writers with their pen names
 Dev Library

References

External links

 Some poems by Chandra Kumar Agarwala at xophura.net.
 আনন্দ চন্দ্ৰ আগৰৱালা | Ananda Chandra Agarwala at Dev Library

Poets from Assam
Assamese-language poets
Asom Sahitya Sabha Presidents
1874 births
1940 deaths
People from Sonitpur district
20th-century Indian poets
Vidyasagar College alumni
Poets in British India